Burnpur Airport  is located at Burnpur in Asansol, India. It is a private airport owned by IISCO Steel Plant of Steel Authority of India and can handle small aircraft.

Facilities
The airport is located at an elevation of 310 feet (94 m) above mean sea level. It has one runway designated 9/27 with an asphalt surface measuring 4,003 by 75 feet (1,220 × 23 m) with non-precision approach markings.

Airlines and destinations
No airline currently operates from this airport. Operations are all set to start after the congestion of the Kazi Nazrul Islam Airport, Andal, Paschim Bardhaman

See also
 List of Airports by ICAO code
 List of Airports in India

References

 https://web.archive.org/web/20120421185243/http://airportguide.com/airport/India/Burnpur-VE23/

Airports in West Bengal
Transport in Asansol
Year of establishment missing